Rui Miguel Teixeira Caetano  (born 20 April 1991) is a Portuguese former professional footballer who played as a left winger.

He began his career with Paços de Ferreira, playing 100 Primeira Liga games for that club and Gil Vicente. He also reached a century of appearances in LigaPro, representing mostly Penafiel.

Club career

Paços de Ferreira
Born in Paredes, Metropolitan Area of Porto, Caetano joined FC Porto's youth system at the age of 13, being released in 2010 and joining F.C. Paços de Ferreira shortly after. He made his Primeira Liga debut on 14 August of that year, starting and assisting Mario Rondón for the game's only goal in a home win against Sporting CP.

On 23 April 2011, Caetano played in a 2–1 loss to S.L. Benfica in the Taça da Liga final, as a 71st-minute substitute for Manuel José. He scored his first career goal six days later, the late winner in a win by the same score at home to Vitória S.C. after replacing the same teammate.

Caetano played 24 matches in 2012–13 (20 from the bench, 606 minutes of action), as Paços finished a best-ever third and qualified to the UEFA Champions League for the first time in their history. He scored his only goal of the season on 28 April 2013, netting the final 2–2 at Vitória Guimarães in the 88th minute.

Gil Vicente
On 2 January 2014, Caetano signed for fellow league club Gil Vicente FC, penning a contract until June of the following year. He appeared in 20 games in his debut campaign, which ended in relegation as second from bottom.

Penafiel and Aves
On 17 August 2015, Caetano joined F.C. Penafiel of the Segunda Liga as a free agent. He played regularly in a mid-table finish, scoring once on 23 January with a last-ditch equaliser in a 1–1 home draw with S.C. Olhanense.

Caetano moved on 23 June 2016 to C.D. Aves of the same league, on a one-year contract. He was used more often as a substitute as the team won promotion as runners-up; on 7 May, on a rare start, he scored the decisive goal of a 2–1 home victory over his previous club.

On 15 July 2017, Caetano returned to Penafiel, being presented as a surprise at a members' meeting. His first season back ended prematurely on 5 May in the penultimate round against fellow promotion-chasers Académico de Viseu F.C. as he was shown a straight red card after the match had already finished.

Caetano scored a career-best four goals the following campaign, despite rarely starting. One was the added-time winner in a 5–4 away defeat of Vitória S.C. B, on 8 April 2019.

Varzim
After six months of inactivity, Caetano signed an 18-month deal with second-tier Varzim S.C. on 4 December 2019, reuniting with former Penafiel manager Paulo Alves. He alleged that he had signed for Paços de Ferreira at the start of the season, which was denied by the club.

Aged only 29, Caetano made his final appearance on 10 January 2021, scoring the winner in a 2–1 comeback victory at Penafiel.

International career
In 2010, although he appeared for the Portuguese under-19 team during the qualifying phase, where he scored against Macedonia, Caetano was not called to the UEFA European Under-19 Championship. On 22 May 2011 he was selected by the under-20s for the 2011 Toulon Tournament, playing three games in an eventual group stage exit.

Caetano participated at the 2011 FIFA U-20 World Cup in Colombia, only missing two matches in seven as the nation finished in second place. He made his debut for the under-21 side on 5 September 2011, in a friendly with France; all youth categories comprised, he won 43 caps and netted twice.

Personal life
Caetano's father, Agostinho, was also a professional footballer. During his career, the former helped the latter – who had also left the professional game early – in his real estate business, a reason why he never played for a team outside of the north. He owned seven recreational facilities in his own name by the time of his retirement.

Career statistics

Honours
Paços de Ferreira
Taça da Liga runner-up: 2010–11

Portugal U20
FIFA U-20 World Cup runner-up: 2011

Orders
 Knight of the Order of Prince Henry

References

External links

1991 births
Living people
People from Paredes, Portugal
Sportspeople from Porto District
Portuguese footballers
Association football wingers
Primeira Liga players
Liga Portugal 2 players
F.C. Paços de Ferreira players
Gil Vicente F.C. players
F.C. Penafiel players
C.D. Aves players
Varzim S.C. players
Portugal youth international footballers
Portugal under-21 international footballers